Delia Sheppard (born July 29, 1960) is a Danish actress, model, singer and dancer.

Career 
Sheppard began studying ballet dancing at age 9 and went on to perform in Denmark, France and South Africa. She would most notably dance for the Royal Danish Ballet, Paris Opera and Lido de Paris.

In 1985, she released a 2-track record single in France entitled "Action."

Also while in France, she worked as a fashion model, modeling the fashions of Karl Lagerfeld, Christian Dior, and Jean-Paul Gaultier.

After suffering a back injury, Sheppard moved to Hollywood to pursue a career in acting. Her acting roles include appearances in such movies as Rocky V, Any Given Sunday, Mirror Images and Night Rhythms. She has also guest starred on TV series such as Northern Exposure and Night Court.

She was Penthouse magazine's Pet of the Month for April 1988. In 2005, in The Erotic Thriller in Contemporary Cinema, Linda Ruth Williams cited Sheppard and Kira Reed as examples of actresses who worked "in B-scale erotic thrillers at the fringes of Hollywood, the obvious trajectory for a strip-circuit veteran (DTV [direct-to-video] divas Kira Reed and Delia Sheppard both started as showgirls.)"

In more recent years, Sheppard has worked as a showgirl in Las Vegas, performing in such shows as Splash and Showgirl Follies, Life in Feathers and Rhinestones.

Filmography
2018: Show Dogs 
2010: Dinocroc vs. Supergator (TV)
2009: Vampire in Vegas 
1999: Any Given Sunday 
1994: Point of Seduction: Body Chemistry III 
1993: Sins of Desire 
1992: Animal Instincts 
1992: Night Rhythms 
1992: Secret Games
1992: Mirror Images
1990: Rocky V
1990: Witchcraft II: The Temptress
1990: Haunting Fear
1989: Young Rebels 
1974: The Spots on My Leopard

References

External links

1961 births
Danish film actresses
Danish female models
Living people
Penthouse Pets
Danish ballerinas